Gatú o Gatucito is a corregimiento in Santa Fé District, Veraguas Province, Panama with a population of 1,315 as of 2010. Its population as of 1990 was 1,670, going up to 1,707 as of 2000.

References

Corregimientos of Veraguas Province